The Perkiomen Trail is a  multi-use rail trail along the Perkiomen Creek in Pennsylvania.

It begins at the junction with the Schuylkill River Trail near the mouth of the Perkiomen and Valley Forge National Historical Park and ends in Green Lane Park.  It follows the Perkiomen and connects Lower Perkiomen Valley Park, Central Perkiomen Valley Park, and Green Lane Park.  The trail is mostly gravel, with some sections being paved.

The abandoned portion of Perkiomen Branch of the Reading Railroad was purchased by Montgomery County in 1978, and the trail mostly follows the former railroad bed.  It was completed in 2003.

It passes through ten communities (from south to north): Oaks, Arcola, Yerkes, Collegeville, Rahns, Graterford, Schwenksville, Spring Mount, Upper Salford, and Green Lane.

Natural Lands and the Montgomery County Lands Trust have spent over $7 million to establish an easement to ensure that this trail remains an open space in Montgomery County, Pennsylvania.

References

External links

Home of the Perkiomen Trail
Access points
Perkiomen Railroad
Perkiomen Trail on TrailLink

Rail trails in Pennsylvania
Reading Company
Parks in Montgomery County, Pennsylvania